This list of the mammals of Pakistan shows the conservation status of the 173 mammal species occurring in Pakistan, of which 12 are critically endangered, 11 are endangered, 14 are vulnerable, and 10 are near threatened. The largest mammal in Pakistan is the Himalayan brown bear. The markhor is the national animal of Pakistan.
The following tags are used to highlight each species' conservation status as assessed on the IUCN Red List:

Order: Primates 

The order Primates contains humans and their closest relatives: lemurs, lorisoids, monkeys, and apes.
Suborder: Haplorhini
Infraorder: Simiiformes
Parvorder: Catarrhini
Superfamily: Cercopithecoidea
Family: Cercopithecidae (Old World monkeys)
Genus: Macaca
Rhesus macaque, M. mulatta 
Genus: Semnopithecus
Kashmir gray langur, S. ajax 
Nepal gray langur, S. schistaceus

Order: Rodentia (rodents) 

Rodents make up the largest order of mammals, with over 40% of mammalian species. They have two incisors in the upper and lower jaw which grow continually and must be kept short by gnawing.
Suborder: Hystricognathi
Family: Hystricidae (Old World porcupines)
Genus: Hystrix
Indian crested porcupine, H. indica 
Suborder: Sciurognathi
Family: Sciuridae (squirrels)
Subfamily: Sciurinae
Tribe: Pteromyini
Genus: Eoglaucomys
 Kashmir flying squirrel, E. fimbriatus 
Genus: Eupetaurus
 Woolly flying squirrel, E. cinereus 
 Genus: Petaurista
 Red giant flying squirrel, P. petaurista 
Subfamily: Callosciurinae
Genus: Funambulus
 Northern palm squirrel, F. pennantii 
Subfamily: Xerinae
Tribe: Marmotini
Genus: Marmota
 Long-tailed marmot, Marmota caudata LC
 Himalayan marmot, Marmota himalayana LC
Family: Gliridae (dormice)
Subfamily: Leithiinae
Genus: Dryomys
 Balochistan forest dormouse, Dryomys niethammeri VU
 Forest dormouse, Dryomys nitedula LC
Family: Dipodidae (jerboas)
Subfamily: Allactaginae
Genus: Allactaga
 Small five-toed jerboa, Allactaga elater LC
 Hotson's jerboa, Allactaga hotsoni LC
Subfamily: Cardiocraniinae
Genus: Salpingotus
 Baluchistan pygmy jerboa, Salpingotus michaelis LC
Subfamily: Dipodinae
Genus: Jaculus
 Blanford's jerboa, Jaculus blanfordi LC
Subfamily: Sicistinae
Genus: Sicista
 Chinese birch mouse, Sicista concolor LC
Family: Calomyscidae
Genus: Calomyscus
 Baluchi mouse-like hamster, Calomyscus baluchi LC
 Hotson's mouse-like hamster, Calomyscus hotsoni EN
Family: Cricetidae
Subfamily: Cricetinae
Genus: Cricetulus
 Grey dwarf hamster, Cricetulus migratorius LC
Subfamily: Arvicolinae
Genus: Alticola
 White-tailed mountain vole, Alticola albicauda LC
 Silver mountain vole, Alticola argentatus LC
Genus: Ellobius
 Southern mole vole, Ellobius fuscocapillus LC
Genus: Hyperacrius
 True's vole, Hyperacrius fertilis LC
 Murree vole, Hyperacrius wynnei LC
Genus: Microtus
 Juniper vole, Microtus juldaschi LC
Family: Muridae (mice, rats, voles, gerbils, hamsters)
Subfamily: Deomyinae
Genus: Acomys
 Arabian spiny mouse, Acomys dimidiatus LC
Subfamily: Gerbillinae
Genus: Gerbillus
 Swarthy gerbil, Gerbillus aquilus LC
 Indian hairy-footed gerbil, Gerbillus gleadowi
 Balochistan gerbil, Gerbillus nanus LC
Genus: Meriones
 Indian desert jird, Meriones hurrianae LC
 Persian jird, Meriones persicus LC
 Libyan jird, Meriones libycus LC
 Sundevall's jird, Meriones crassus LC
Genus: Rhombomys
 Great gerbil, Rhombomys opimus LC
Genus: Tatera
 Indian gerbil, Tatera indica LC
Subfamily: Murinae
Genus: Apodemus
 Kashmir field mouse, Apodemus rusiges LC
 Ward's field mouse, Apodemus wardi LC
Genus: Bandicota
 Lesser bandicoot rat, Bandicota bengalensis LC
Genus: Golunda
 Indian bush rat, Golunda ellioti LC
Genus: Millardia
 Sand-colored soft-furred rat, Millardia gleadowi LC
 Soft-furred rat, Millardia meltada LC
Genus: Mus
 Rock-loving mouse, M. saxicola LC
Earth-colored mouse, M. terricolor 
House mouse, M. musculus 
 Rock-loving mouse, M. saxicola LC
Genus: Nesokia
 Short-tailed bandicoot rat, N. indica LC
Genus: Niviventer
 Chestnut white-bellied rat, N. fulvescens LC
Genus: Rattus
Turkestan rat, R. pyctorius 
Black rat, R. rattus 
Brown rat, R. norvegicus  introduced

Order: Lagomorpha (lagomorphs) 

The lagomorphs comprise two families, Leporidae (hares and rabbits), and Ochotonidae (pikas). Though they can resemble rodents, and were classified as a superfamily in that order until the early 20th century, they have since been considered a separate order. They differ from rodents in a number of physical characteristics, such as having four incisors in the upper jaw rather than two.

Family: Ochotonidae (pikas)
Genus: Ochotona
 Ladak pika, O. ladacensis 
 Large-eared pika, O. macrotis 
 Royle's pika, O. roylei 
 Afghan pika, O. rufescens 
Family: Leporidae (rabbits, hares)
Genus: Lepus
Cape hare, L. capensis 
Indian hare, L. nigricollis 
Desert hare, L. tibetanus

Order: Erinaceomorpha (hedgehogs and gymnures) 

The order Erinaceomorpha contains a single family, Erinaceidae, which comprise the hedgehogs and gymnures. The hedgehogs are easily recognised by their spines while gymnures look more like large rats.

Family: Erinaceidae (hedgehogs)
Subfamily: Erinaceinae
Genus: Hemiechinus
 Long-eared hedgehog, H. auritus 
 Indian long-eared hedgehog, H. collaris 
Genus: Paraechinus
 Brandt's hedgehog, P. hypomelas 
 Indian hedgehog, P. micropus

Order: Soricomorpha (shrews, moles, and solenodons) 

The "shrew-forms" are insectivorous mammals. The shrews and solenodons closely resemble mice while the moles are stout-bodied burrowers.
Family: Soricidae (shrews)
Subfamily: Crocidurinae
Genus: Crocidura
 Gmelin's white-toothed shrew, Crocidura gmelini LC
 Pale gray shrew, Crocidura pergrisea DD
 Asian gray shrew, Crocidura suaveolens
 Zarudny's shrew, Crocidura zarudnyi LC
Genus: Suncus
 Etruscan shrew, Suncus etruscus LC
Asian house shrew, S. murinus 
 Anderson's shrew, Suncus stoliczkanus LC
Subfamily: Soricinae
Tribe: Soricini
Genus: Sorex
 Kashmir shrew, Sorex planiceps LC

Order: Chiroptera (bats) 

The bats' most distinguishing feature is that their forelimbs are developed as wings, making them the only mammals capable of flight. Bat species account for about 20% of all mammals.
Family: Pteropodidae (flying foxes, Old World fruit bats)
Subfamily: Pteropodinae
Genus: Pteropus
Indian flying fox, P. giganteus 
Genus: Rousettus
 Egyptian fruit bat, Rousettus aegyptiacus LC
 Leschenault's rousette, Rousettus leschenaultii LC
Family: Vespertilionidae
Subfamily: Myotinae
Genus: Myotis
Lesser mouse-eared bat, M. blythii 
 Whiskered myotis, Myotis muricola LC
Geoffroy's bat, M. emarginatus 
 Kashmir cave bat, Myotis longipes DD
Subfamily: Vespertilioninae
Genus: Barbastella
 Eastern barbastelle, Barbastella leucomelas LC
Genus: Eptesicus
 Botta's serotine, Eptesicus bottae LC
 Gobi big brown bat, Eptesicus gobiensis LC
 Serotine bat, Eptesicus serotinus LC
Genus: Nyctalus
 Common noctule, N. noctula 
 Lesser noctule, N. leisleri 
 Mountain noctule, Nyctalus montanus LC
Genus: Otonycteris
 Desert long-eared bat, Otonycteris hemprichii LC
Genus: Pipistrellus
 Savi's pipistrelle, H. savii 
 Kelaart's pipistrelle, Pipistrellus ceylonicus LC
 Indian pipistrelle, Pipistrellus coromandra LC
 Java pipistrelle, Pipistrellus javanicus LC
 Kuhl's pipistrelle, Pipistrellus kuhlii LC
 Common pipistrelle, Pipistrellus pipistrellus LC
 Least pipistrelle, Pipistrellus tenuis LC
Genus: Rhyneptesicus
Sind bat, R. nasutus 
Genus: Scotoecus
 Desert yellow bat, Scotoecus pallidus NT
Genus: Scotophilus
 Greater Asiatic yellow bat, Scotophilus heathi LC
 Lesser Asiatic yellow bat, Scotophilus kuhlii LC
Genus: Scotozous
 Dormer's pipistrelle, Scotozous dormeri LC
Subfamily: Murininae
Genus: Murina
 Hutton's tube-nosed bat, Murina huttoni LC
 Scully's tube-nosed bat, Murina tubinaris LC
Family: Rhinopomatidae
Genus: Rhinopoma
 Lesser mouse-tailed bat, Rhinopoma hardwickei LC
 Greater mouse-tailed bat, Rhinopoma microphyllum LC
 Small mouse-tailed bat, Rhinopoma muscatellum LC
Family: Emballonuridae
Genus: Taphozous
 Naked-rumped tomb bat, Taphozous nudiventris LC
 Egyptian tomb bat, Taphozous perforatus LC
Family: Megadermatidae
Genus: Megaderma
 Greater false vampire bat, Megaderma lyra LC
Family: Rhinolophidae
Subfamily: Rhinolophinae
Genus: Rhinolophus
Blasius's horseshoe bat, R. blasii 
Greater horseshoe bat, R. ferrumequinum 
Lesser horseshoe bat, R. hipposideros 
 Blyth's horseshoe bat, Rhinolophus lepidus LC
 Big-eared horseshoe bat, Rhinolophus macrotis LC
Subfamily: Hipposiderinae
Genus: Asellia
 Trident leaf-nosed bat, Asellia tridens LC
Genus: Hipposideros
 Ashy roundleaf bat, Hipposideros cineraceus LC
 Fulvus roundleaf bat, Hipposideros fulvus LC
 Genus: Triaenops
 Rufous trident bat, Triaenops persicus LC
 Family: Molossidae
 Genus: Tadarida
European free-tailed bat, T. teniotis

Order: Pholidota (pangolins) 

The order Pholidota comprises the eight species of pangolin. Pangolins are anteaters and have the powerful claws, elongated snout and long tongue seen in the other unrelated anteater species.

Family: Manidae
Genus: Manis
 Indian pangolin, M. crassicaudata

Order: Cetacea (whales) 

The order Cetacea includes whales, dolphins and porpoises. They are the mammals most fully adapted to aquatic life with a spindle-shaped nearly hairless body, protected by a thick layer of blubber, and forelimbs and tail modified to provide propulsion underwater.
Suborder: Mysticeti
Family: Balaenopteridae
Subfamily: Balaenopterinae
Genus: Balaenoptera
 Bryde's whale, Balaenoptera edeni DD
 Pygmy blue whale, Balaenoptera musculus brevicauda EN
 Fin whale, Balaenoptera physalus EN
Subfamily: Megapterinae
Genus: Megaptera
Humpback whale, M. novaeangliae 
Suborder: Odontoceti
Superfamily: Platanistoidea
Family: Platanistidae
Genus: Platanista
Indus river dolphin, P. minor 
Family: Phocoenidae
Genus: Neophocaena
 Finless porpoise, Neophocaena phocaenoides DD
Family: Kogiidae
Genus: Kogia
Pygmy sperm whale, K. breviceps 
 Dwarf sperm whale, Kogia sima LC
Family: Physeteridae
Genus: Physeter
 Sperm whale, Physeter macrocephalus VU
Family: Ziphidae
Subfamily: Hyperoodontinae
Genus: Mesoplodon
 Blainville's beaked whale, Mesoplodon densirostris DD
 Ginkgo-toothed beaked whale, Mesoplodon ginkgodens DD
Family: Delphinidae (marine dolphins)
Genus: Steno
 Rough-toothed dolphin, Steno bredanensis DD
Genus: Sousa
 Indo-Pacific humback dolphin, Sousa chinensis
Genus: Tursiops
 Indo-Pacific bottlenose dolphin, Tursiops aduncus
 Common bottlenose dolphin, Tursiops truncatus
Genus: Stenella
 Spinner dolphin, Stenella longirostris LC
Genus: Delphinus
 Common dolphin, Delphinus capensis LC
Genus: Lagenodelphis
 Fraser's dolphin, Lagenodelphis hosei DD
Genus: Grampus
 Risso's dolphin, Grampus griseus DD
Genus: Peponocephala
 Melon-headed whale, Peponocephala electra LC
Genus: Feresa
 Pygmy killer whale, Feresa attenuata DD
Genus: Orcinus
Orca, O. orca

Order: Carnivora (carnivorans) 

There are over 260 species of carnivorans, the majority of which eat meat as their primary dietary item. They have a characteristic skull shape and dentition.
Suborder: Feliformia
Family: Felidae (cats)
Subfamily: Felinae
Genus: Caracal
Caracal, C. caracal 
Genus: Felis
Jungle cat, F. chaus 
African wildcat, F. lybica 
Asiatic wildcat, F. l. ornata
Sand cat, F. margarita  possibly extirpated
Turkestan sand cat, F. m. thinobia possibly extirpated
Genus: Lynx
Eurasian lynx, L. lynx 
Genus: Otocolobus
Pallas's cat, O. manul 
Genus: Prionailurus
Leopard cat, P. bengalensis 
Fishing cat, P. viverrinus 
Subfamily: Pantherinae
Genus: Panthera
Leopard P. pardus 
Indian leopard, P. p. fusca
Persian leopard, P. p. tulliana
Snow leopard, P. uncia 
Family: Viverridae
Subfamily: Paradoxurinae
Genus: Paguma
Masked palm civet, P. larvata 
Subfamily: Viverrinae
Genus: Viverricula
Small Indian civet, V. indica 
Family: Herpestidae (mongooses)
Genus: Urva
Indian grey mongoose, U. edwardsii 
Small Indian mongoose, U. auropunctatus 
Family: Hyaenidae (hyaenas)
Genus: Hyaena
Striped hyena, H. hyaena 
Suborder: Caniformia
Family: Canidae (dogs, foxes)
Genus: Canis
Golden jackal, C. aureus 
Persian jackal, C. a. aureus
Gray wolf, C. lupus 
Eurasian wolf, C. l. lupus
Indian wolf, C. l. pallipes 
Genus: Cuon
Dhole, C. alpinus  presence uncertain
Genus: Vulpes
Bengal fox, V. bengalensis 
Blanford's fox, V. cana 
Rüppell's fox, V. rueppellii 
Red fox, V. vulpes 
Family: Ursidae (bears)
Genus: Ursus
Brown bear, U. arctos 
Himalayan brown bear, U. a. isabellinus 
Asiatic black bear, U. thibetanus 
Balochistan black bear, U. t. gedrosianus
Himalayan black bear, U. t. laniger
Family: Mustelidae (mustelids)
Genus: Lutra
European otter, L. lutra 
Genus: Lutrogale
Smooth-coated otter, L. perspicillata 
Genus: Martes
Yellow-throated marten, M. flavigula 
Beech marten, M. foina 
Genus: Mellivora
Honey badger, M. capensis 
Genus: Mustela
Mountain weasel, M. altaica 
Stoat, M. erminea 
Genus: Vormela
Marbled polecat, V. peregusna

Order: Artiodactyla (even-toed ungulates) 

The even-toed ungulates are ungulates whose weight is borne about equally by the third and fourth toes, rather than mostly or entirely by the third as in perissodactyls. There are about 220 artiodactyl species, including many that are of great economic importance to humans.
Family: Moschidae
Genus: Moschus
 Kashmir musk deer, M. cupreus 
Family: Cervidae (deer)
Subfamily: CervinaeGenus: AxisChital, A. axis  introduced 
Indian hog deer, A. porcinus 
Genus: MuntiacusIndian muntjac, M. muntjak 
Family: Bovidae (cattle, antelope, sheep, goats)
Subfamily: Antilopinae
Genus: GazellaChinkara, G. bennettii 
Goitered gazelle, G. subgutturosa 
Subfamily: Bovinae
Genus: Boselaphus Nilgai, B. tragocamelus 
Subfamily: Caprinae
Genus: CapraWild goat, C. aegagrus 
 Sindh ibex, C. a. blythi Chiltan ibex, C. a. chialtanensisMarkhor, C. falconeri 
Siberian ibex, C. sibrica 
Genus: NemorhaedusHimalayan goral, N. goral 
Genus: OvisArgali, O. ammon 
Urial, O. vignei 
Genus: PseudoisBharal, P. nayaur 
Family: Suidae (pigs)
Subfamily: Suinae
Genus: SusWild boar, S. scrofa 

 Order: Perissodactyla (odd-toed ungulates) 
 Family: Equidae
 Genus: Equus Onager, E. hemionus  presence uncertain
 Kiang, E. kiang 

 Locally extinct
The following species are locally extinct in the country:
 Cheetah, Acinonyx jubatus Blackbuck, Antilope cervicapra (extinct in wild) 
 Central Asian red deer, Cervus hanglu (possibly locally extinct)
 Asian elephant, Elephas maximus Indian wild ass Equus hemionus khur Lion, Panthera leo Tiger, Panthera tigris Indian rhinoceros, Rhinoceros unicornis Barasingha, Rucervus duvaucelii''

See also
List of endangered species in Pakistan
List of chordate orders
Lists of mammals by region
Mammal classification

References

External links

 
Mammals
Pakistan
Pakistan
Pakistan